The 2019 Abierto Zapopan was a professional tennis tournament played on outdoor hard courts. It was the 1st edition of the tournament and part of the 2019 WTA 125K series, offering a total of $125,000 in prize money. It took place in Guadalajara, Mexico on 11–16 March 2019.

Singles main draw entrants

Seeds 

 1 Rankings as of 4 March 2019.

Other entrants 
The following players received a wildcard into the singles main draw:
  Giuliana Olmos
  Renata Zarazúa
  Sofya Zhuk

The following players qualified into the singles main draw:
  Natalija Kostić
  Varvara Lepchenko
  Conny Perrin
  Wang Xiyu

The following players received entry into the main draw as lucky losers:
  Paula Badosa Gibert
  Katarina Zavatska

Withdrawals
  Mona Barthel → replaced by  Fiona Ferro
  Eugénie Bouchard → replaced by  Anhelina Kalinina
  Margarita Gasparyan → replaced by  Vitalia Diatchenko
  Dalila Jakupović → replaced by  Sara Errani
  Pauline Parmentier → replaced by  Anna Blinkova
  Anastasia Potapova → replaced by  Paula Badosa Gibert
  Sara Sorribes Tormo → replaced by  Katarina Zavatska
  Taylor Townsend → replaced by  Ana Bogdan
  Stefanie Vögele → replaced by  Heather Watson
  Wang Yafan → replaced by  Yanina Wickmayer
  Tamara Zidanšek → replaced by  Marie Bouzková
  Vera Zvonareva → replaced by  Olga Danilović

Doubles entrants

Seeds 

 1 Rankings as of 4 March 2019.

Other entrants 
The following pair received a wildcard into the doubles main draw:
  Conny Perrin /  Sofya Zhuk

Champions

Singles

  Veronika Kudermetova def.  Marie Bouzková 6–2, 6–0

Doubles

  Maria Sanchez /  Fanny Stollár def.  Cornelia Lister /  Renata Voráčová 7–5, 6–1

References

External links 
 Official website

2019 Abierto Zapopan
2019 WTA 125K series
2019 in Mexican tennis
March 2019 sports events in Mexico